"Big Spender" is a song written by Cy Coleman and Dorothy Fields for the musical Sweet Charity, first performed in 1966. Peggy Lee was the first artist to record the song for her album of the same name  also that year. It is sung, in the musical, by the dance hostess girls; it was choreographed by Bob Fosse for the Broadway musical and the 1969 film.  It is set to the beat of a striptease as the girls taunt the customers.

Shirley Bassey version 

A hit version of the song by Shirley Bassey reached No. 21 in the UK Singles Chart in December 1967. This version is featured in the 2004 film The Life and Death of Peter Sellers, and in the 2005 film Nynne. The song has become one of Bassey's signature songs. She has performed the song numerous times, most notably for the 80th birthday of Prince Philip. She also sang it at the 2007 Glastonbury Festival.

In December 2007, it was re-released in a new remixed version as a digital download. This was the third and final single released from the album Get the Party Started. The single features a remix from Pink Pound and two instrumental remixes that were not included on the album release. Unlike the previous two singles this track featured a remix of a previous released recording, the vocal track was taken from a session recorded in 1984 for the album I Am What I Am. There was no promotion undertaken for the single and no video was made to support the release.

Track listing
 Big Spender
 Dangerous Game

Other versions

Recorded versions
 Peggy Lee recorded the song in 1966. Her rendition became a hit on the US Easy Listening chart in that year.
 The Ritchie Family recorded a disco version on their 1978 album American Generation.
 Chaka Khan included a version on her album ClassiKhan (2004).
 Bette Midler covered the song for her Peggy Lee tribute album Bette Midler Sings the Peggy Lee Songbook, which was released in 2005.
 Jennifer Love Hewitt recorded a version of the song for a promo for her TV series The Client List.
 Lana Del Rey sings a variation of the song's chorus throughout English rapper Smiler's song "Spender" for his 2012 mixtape All I Know.
 Theophilus London did a version on his 2012 mixtape Rose Island Vol. 1, rapping over a DJ Carnage remix featuring ASAP Rocky.
 Skepta raps over a grime remix of Theophilus London's version.
 Dee Snider performed the song with Cyndi Lauper on the 2012 album Dee Does Broadway.

Live performances
 In the late 1970s Tom Waits often performed "Big Spender" as a medley with his song "Small Change".
 Boney M. performed this song during live concerts. A video recording of this number was made by TV Ireland in 1978 and published on the Boneу M. DIAMONDS video collection in 2015.
 Queen performed it Live at Wembley Stadium on July 12, 1986, and also performed it live in period between 1973 and 1977; it is included on the concert recordings A Night at the Odeon (Hammersmith, 1975) and Live at the Rainbow '74 (Rainbow, November 1974).
 Dionne Warwick and Debby Boone performed the song on Boone's show One Step Closer in 1982.
 The Pussycat Dolls performed the song live at the 2004 MTV Asia Awards, with Melody Thornton on lead vocals.
 The Pussycat Dolls Doll Domination Tour that started in 2009, featured Ashley Roberts, Jessica Sutta, and Kimberly Wyatt dancing "Big Spender", followed by a performance by Melody Thornton.
 Seal performed it in his Leopard disguise on the second season of The Masked Singer.
 Gloria Hunniford performed it in her Snow Leopard disguise on the third series of The Masked Singer UK.

Parodies and alternate lyrics
 A well known take-off of the song was shown on The Morecambe and Wise Christmas Show 1975, sung by Brenda Arnau, and featuring Pan's People as guest dancers.
 The song appeared in Muriel Cigar commercials in the 1970s, sung by Edie Adams. A modified version of the tune entreated the viewer to "...spend a little dime with me", referring to the price of a Muriel Cigar.
 In an episode of British Asian sketch comedy show Goodness Gracious Me, the cast perform a parody of the song called "Big Spinster".
 In the "Two Bad Neighbors" episode of The Simpsons, Homer Simpson performed the song at a yard sale with new lyrics to reflect the merchandise he is promoting.
 In the Discworld Noir computer game the 'Troll Saphire' performed a parody of "Big Spender", with the opening lyrics as "The minute you walked through the wall, I could tell that you were a troll of destruction"
 In the "Viva Mars Vegas" episode of Futurama, a parody version is played of "Big Spender", with the lyrics as "Hey Rich Lobster", when Dr. Zoidberg shows up at a casino on Mars with millions of dollars to spend and lose.
 A controversial video with flight attendants entreating an elite frequent flier made news in February 2019, generating protest from the flight attendants' union.
A parody appeared on a musical segment of SNL on Halloween of 2020 called "Big Spreader", referring to COVID-19.

Samples
 The 2007 single "Roc-A-Fella Billionaires" by Freeway featuring Jay-Z samples Helen Gallagher's version of the song.
 The 2012 single "Big Spender" by Theophilus London and ASAP Rocky samples Peggy Lee's rendition of "Big Spender".

Television and film appearances
 During the animated opening credits of The Pink Panther Strikes Again (1976), animator Richard Williams has a lineup of Pink Panthers in a parody of the hostess girls' staging; Henry Mancini quotes "Big Spender," seguing seamlessly into the "Pink Panther Theme."
 In Hou Hsiao-hsien's 1987 film Daughter of the Nile, the song plays twice from Lin Hsiao-fang's restaurant.
 In National Lampoon's European Vacation, Ellen Griswold performs "Big Spender" with exotic dancing while Clark (her husband) videotapes it.
 In 1998, the song was sung by Vanessa Marcil, Vanita Harbour, Lynn Herring, and Jennifer Hammon on the soap opera General Hospital  during the hospital’s annual Nurses Ball.
 In "Dream On", a season 1 episode of Glee, a woman auditioning for Les Misérables sings this song. The song was performed again on the season 3 premiere "The Purple Piano Project" by Sugar (Vanessa Lengies), a student who can't sing.
 The song was sung by Ellis on the first episode of The Glee Project.
 In the Grounded for Life episode "Mrs. Finnerty, You've Got a Lovely Daughter", Sean gets the song approved for his daughter Lily to perform at her Catholic school talent show.
 In the promo for The Client List, Jennifer Love Hewitt performs this song.
 The song appears in the trailer for Johnny Depp's Mortdecai.
 The first episode of Fosse/Verdon opens with the number.
 The song appears in the trailer for the Netflix television series Ratched.

References

External links
 Lyrics of Shirley Bassey's version of Big Spender
 Shirley Bassey sings Big Spender BBC archive footage

1967 singles
Songs from musicals
Songs with music by Cy Coleman
Songs with lyrics by Dorothy Fields
The Muppets songs
Shirley Bassey songs
Peggy Lee songs
1966 songs
United Artists Records singles